is a Japanese gunka song composed by Isao Hayashi with lyrics by Daisaburō Ikuta.  It was released by King Records in October 1939.

History 
An accompanying music video was released in 1940.  Recently, this song has been broadcast by sound trucks in Japan owned by uyoku dantai.

References 

Japanese-language songs
1939 songs
Japanese patriotic songs